A Hun is a member of the Huns, a confederation of nomadic tribes in Western Asia and Europe in late antiquity.

Hun or huns may also refer to:

Arts and entertainment 
 Hun, a British subcultural stereotype, see Hun culture
 Hun, a character in Pokémon
 Hun, a character in Teenage Mutant Ninja Turtles
 The Hun (cartoonist), a pseudonymous erotic artist
 The Huns (film) a 1960 Italian film
 Hun (instrument), a clay Korean flute

Biology 
 Hun, a nickname for Hungarian partridge
 Hun shrew, (Crocidura attila), a mammal species found in parts of Africa

Geography 
 Húns, a village in Friesland, Netherlands
 River Hun,  Norfolk, England
 Hun River (Liao River tributary), Liaoning Province, China
 Hun River (Yalu River tributary), China
 Hun, Iran, a village in Hormozgan Province
 Hun, Libya, a town
 HUN, Chapman code for Huntingdonshire, county in England

History 
 The Xiongnu, a confederation of nomadic tribes in North-East Asia from the 3rd Century BCE to the late 1st Century CE
 The Hunas, "Iranian Huns" and/or Xionites: tribes in Asia between the 4th and 7th Centuries
 "Red Huns", who were possibly synonymous with the "Alchon Huns"  and/or Kidarites;
 "Alchon Huns"
 "White Huns", possibly synonymous with, or included the Hephtalites
 "Nezak Huns"
 North Caucasian Huns, Daghestan, a people who settled in Daghestan during the 6th and 7th centuries
 Hun of East Anglia, 8th century ruler
 Hun soul, in Chinese folk beliefs

Transportation
 Hualien Airport's IATA airport code
 Huntingdon railway station's National Rail station code
 Huntington (Amtrak station)'s station code

Other uses 
 Hun School of Princeton, New Jersey, United States
 F-100 Super Sabre nickname
 Derogatory term used for Germans
 Hun, an insult used for Rangers F.C. supporters
 HUN, an ISO country code for Hungary
 Huntsman Corporation, NYSE symbol
 Hun, literally means Human in Mongolian Language.

See also
 Huna (disambiguation)
 Hunnic (disambiguation)
 Hunni